The 1925–26 season was Stoke City's 26th season in the Football League and the seventh in the Second Division. It was also the first season under the name of Stoke City.

Stoke-on-Trent was granted city status in 1925 and so Stoke added the word 'City' to their name and have since been forever known as Stoke City. However, despite a change of name there was no change in fortunes on the pitch as Stoke failed to improve after last season's narrow escape and they were relegated to the Third Division North this time finishing one point from safety.

Season review

League
The 1925–26 season was a season of change as Stoke F.C. became Stoke City F.C. and there was a new offside law introduced which allowed two opponents (not three as before) to be between the attacker and the goal. This change prompted many high scoring matches throughout the county as teams struggled to adapt the changes with the traditional 2–3–5 formation, eventually teams started to use new formations and tactics. But Stoke did not share the high scoring and they struggled all season with many disappointing displays.

Injuries certainly hampered the team's efforts throughout the season and by the new year relegation looked inevitable and despite a late revival a failure to beat Southampton on the final day of the season sealed Stoke's fate and they dropped into the third tier for the first time. However the signing of Huddersfield Town's Charlie Wilson in March 1926 proved to be a vital addition as he would be key in making sure Stoke's stay in the Third Division North would be a short one.

FA Cup
With sides in the top two divisions now starting in the third round Stoke played Wigan Borough and beat them 5–2 however Stoke themselves were on the receiving end of a heavy cup defeat losing 6–3 to Swansea Town in the fourth round.

Final league table

Results
Stoke's score comes first

Legend

Football League Second Division

FA Cup

Squad statistics

References

Stoke City F.C. seasons
Stoke